Knut Erling Granaas (born 21 April 1967 in Asker) is a Norwegian sledge hockey goaltender.

He lost both legs in a traffic accident, and began to compete in sledge hockey in 1992. He has won a gold medal (1998) and two silver medals (1994, 2002) at the Winter Paralympics.

Honours
2002 Winter Paralympics
Silver
2000 World Championships
Silver
1998 Winter Paralympics
Gold
1996 World Championships
Silver
1994 Winter Paralympics
Silver

Awards
2005 – Norges Funksjonshemmedes Idrettsforbunds Idrettsplakett

References

1967 births
Living people
Norwegian sledge hockey players
Paralympic sledge hockey players of Norway
Ice sledge hockey players at the 1994 Winter Paralympics
Ice sledge hockey players at the 1998 Winter Paralympics
Ice sledge hockey players at the 2002 Winter Paralympics
Paralympic gold medalists for Norway
Paralympic silver medalists for Norway
Medalists at the 1994 Winter Paralympics
Medalists at the 1998 Winter Paralympics
Medalists at the 2002 Winter Paralympics
Paralympic medalists in sledge hockey
20th-century Norwegian people
21st-century Norwegian people